Hydnodon is a fungal genus in the family Hydnodontaceae. A monotypic genus. it contains the single species Hydnodon thelephorus, transferred to Hydnodon by Howard James Banker in 1913.

References

Monotypic Basidiomycota genera
Trechisporales
Trechisporales genera